Martin Rozhon (born 30 July 1965) is a retired Czech football striker.

References

1965 births
Living people
Czech footballers
SFC Opava players
FK Drnovice players
MFK Karviná players
Czech First League players
Association football forwards
FK Fotbal Třinec players
MFK Vítkovice players
FC Fastav Zlín players